Limón is a municipality in the department of Colón in Honduras.

According to official census of 2001, has a population of 8,627 inhabitants. Limón is bordered to the north by the Caribbean Sea, to the south and east by the municipality of Iriona, and to the west by the municipalities of Trujillo and Santa Rosa de Aguan.

See also
Real Bella Vista

References

Municipalities of the Colón Department (Honduras)
Garifuna communities